Grand Ayatollah Hossein Mazaheri Isfahani (born November 16 1933) is a senior Iranian Twelver Shia Marja.
He was also a member of the Third Assembly of Experts.

Biography
Grand Ayatollah Hossein Mazaheri was born in Isfahan in 1933. At the age of 14, he moved to Isfahan Seminary to start his religious studies. Five years later, he moved to Qom to complete his studies. In Qom he studied in Seminars of Grand Ayatollah Boroujerdi and Imam Khomeini. Ayatollah Marashi Najafi, Allamah Tabatabei and Mohaqeq Damad were also among his teachers. He currently resides and teaches in the Seminary of Isfahan, Iran.

See also

 Grand Ayatollahs
 List of current Maraji
 Qom
 Ijtihad
 Marja

References

External links
 List of books by Ayatollah Mazaheri

1933 births
Living people
Iranian grand ayatollahs
Members of the Assembly of Experts
Society of Seminary Teachers of Qom members